Ballyneety is a village in County Limerick, Ireland, located approximately 10 km from Limerick city.

The village has an 18-hole golf course, petrol station, multiple takeaway restaurants, a pub, a post office, a garden centre, a car dealership, a credit union, a Garda station, and a funeral home.

Local resident
 Dermot O'Hurley (c.1530 - 20 June 1584), one of the most celebrated of the 24 Irish Catholic Martyrs. While born into the Gaelic nobility of Ireland at or near Emly, the future Archbishop of Cashel was raised at Lickadoon Castle, near Ballyneety, where he was educated by tutors and then sent to Flemish Brabant to study at the University of Leuven.

See also 
 Siege of Limerick (1690)#Sarsfield's raid at Ballyneety

References

External links
 

Towns and villages in County Limerick